The McKenzie House is a historic house at 4911 Arkansas Highway 161 in Scott, Arkansas.  It is a modest single-story wood-frame structure, with a side gable roof, weatherboard siding, and a concrete block foundation.  It has vernacular Italianate features, including windows in beveled corner window bays, and gablets over a pair of symmetrically placed entrances.  It was built c. 1868–75, and is the only known example of Italianate architecture in Scott.

The house was listed on the National Register of Historic Places in 1992.

See also
National Register of Historic Places listings in Pulaski County, Arkansas

References

Houses on the National Register of Historic Places in Arkansas
Italianate architecture in Arkansas
Houses in Pulaski County, Arkansas
National Register of Historic Places in Pulaski County, Arkansas